Chantelle Denise Anderson (born January 22, 1981) is a retired Lebanese-American collegiate and professional basketball player who has played in the Women's National Basketball Association (WNBA) and overseas.

Personal
Chantelle Anderson was born in Loma Linda, California, to Maxine and Paul Anderson and is the oldest of four sisters. Her nickname is "Chan".

High School years
Anderson and her family later moved to Vancouver, Washington, where she attended Hudson's Bay High School.{{fact|date=December 2019}}

College years
Anderson graduated from Vanderbilt University in 2003. In her last year she became Vanderbilt’s all-time female leading scorer with 2,604 points as well as setting the Vanderbilt's Career Field Goal Percentage mark of 65.1%. She was named to the All-American team in 2001.

Anderson was a member of the Gold Medal-winning USA Basketball Jones Cup Team in 2000 as well as being on the Gold Medal-winning U.S. team at the World University Games in 2001.

Vanderbilt's 2001 Female Athlete of the Year.
Named as her team's 2001 co-MVP, along with Trials participant Ashley McElhiney.
Earned 2001 NCAA Midwest Regional All-Tournament team honors after averaging 24.0 plays per game.
Named 2001 All-Southeastern Conference (SEC) first team and 2000 All-SEC second team.
Earned her SEC Tournament MVP honors in 2001.

Anderson was also named to the Vanderbilt Athletics Hall of Fame as part of its inaugural class.

Vanderbilt statistics
Source

WNBA career
Anderson was selected 2nd overall by the Sacramento Monarchs in the 2003 WNBA draft. She spent the 2003 and 2004 seasons with the Monarchs as a utility player. During the 2003 season she appeared in 26 games and averaged 1.6 points in 6.5 minutes per game. She scored a than career-high eight points on June 7 when the Monarchs played against the Los Angeles Sparks. She tallied 42 points in her rookie season with the Monarchs.

In the 2004 season she appeared Appeared in 30 games. She scored a then career-high 10 points, twice against New York on July and again at Detroit as well as a career-high seven rebounds in the same game.

During the 2004-05 off-season played for USVO in Valenciennes Cedex

On May 18, 2005, after two seasons in Sacramento, the Monarchs traded Anderson to the San Antonio Silver Stars and would be one of only four Silver Stars players who would see action in all 34 games played that season. She made a career-high 18 points against the Los Angeles Sparks on July 3, 2006 and a career-high eight rebounds at New York on June 30. Anderson appeared in 20 games before fracturing her patella in her left leg in July 2006. She missed the rest of the season. then a torn Achilles tendon in January 2007.

On February 6, 2008, Anderson was selected by the Atlanta Dream in the expansion draft, but before the 2008 season began, she suffered a torn ACL. Later on May 28, 2008 Chantelle Anderson was waived by the Atlanta Dream. Anderson was recovering from injury at the time. She was re-signed by the Dream on February 12, 2009, then waived again on May 31. In her WNBA career she played in 90 regular season games.

On October 6, 2009 Anderson announced her retirement from professional basketball.

International career
2003-04: she played for MiZo-Pécsi VSK. She was injured at the halfway point of the season.
During the 2004-05 WNBA offseason, Anderson played for USVO in Valenciennes, France, and averaged 9.7 points and 5.4 rebounds per game.
Later, Anderson played for the Galatasaray club in Turkey.

She became a naturalized citizen of Lebanon in 2009 and represented their national team in the FIBA Asia Championship for Women.

After the WNBA
Anderson has worked as a color analyst for FSN and appeared on MTV’s MADE acting as a coach and advisor.

References

External links
Chantelleanderson.com [not active] 
2003 WNBA Draft prospect profile
2009 FIBA Asia Championship

1981 births
Living people
Lebanese women's basketball players
Lebanese women's basketball coaches
American women's basketball players
American women's basketball coaches
American emigrants to Lebanon
All-American college women's basketball players
American expatriate basketball people in Turkey
Basketball players from California
Centers (basketball)
Galatasaray S.K. (women's basketball) players
Lebanese people of African-American descent
People from Loma Linda, California
Sacramento Monarchs players
San Antonio Stars players
Universiade gold medalists for the United States
Universiade medalists in basketball
Vanderbilt Commodores women's basketball players
Virginia Tech Hokies women's basketball coaches
Medalists at the 2001 Summer Universiade
United States women's national basketball team players